The North American Competitiveness Council (NACC) was an official tri-national working group of the Security and Prosperity Partnership of North America (SPP). It was created at the second summit of the SPP in Cancún, Quintana Roo, Mexico, in March 2006. The SPP is an agreement between the leaders of the United States, Canada and Mexico to work towards a more integrated North American economy and security region. Composed of 30 corporate representatives from some of North America's largest companies, the North American Competitiveness Council has been mandated to set priorities for the SPP and to act as a stable driver of the integration process through changes in government in all three countries.

The NACC became inactive in 2009.

History

While the North American Competitiveness Council was officially born on March 31, 2006, at the second annual summit of the Security and Prosperity Partnership of North America, its seeds were planted three months earlier. On January 10 and 11, 2006, United Parcel Service, the Council of the Americas and the North American Business Committee convened a "public/private sector dialogue on the SPP" in Louisville, Kentucky, United States. The meeting was attended by 50 government officials and business leaders from Canada, the U.S. and Mexico, including officials from the Canadian Privy Council Office, the Mexican Presidency, the U.S. Department of Homeland Security and corporate reps from ExxonMobil, DaimlerChrysler, Ford, Tyco, and FedEx.

According to an account of the meeting from the Council of the Americas, attendees discussed "marrying policy issues with business priorities", and that "one critical factor in the success of the SPP will be the active engagement of the North American business community." Private sector supporters of the SPP "need to build a genuine constituency for North American integration if it is to move forward successfully", says the Council of the Americas report. "Leadership from governments that recognizes the importance of business issues to the overall social welfare empowers the private sector to engage substantively and pragmatically on trade and security issues without undue deference to political sensibilities."

On March 15, 2006, North American business leaders met in Washington, D.C. with U.S. Secretary of Commerce Carlos Gutierrez, Canadian Deputy Minister of Industry Suzanne Hurtubise and Dr. Alberto Ortega from the Mexican Presidency. According to a backgrounder from the Council of the Americas, the government officials were interested in "the views of the North American business community on priorities for the SPP, as well as recommendations from business leaders on how the SPP can help their companies be more competitive in the global market, how SPP can reduce the cost of doing business, and any specific recommendations to cut red tape or eliminate unnecessary barriers to trade in North America." Business leaders were also asked about the possible creation and institutionalization of a North American Competitiveness Council. There was unanimous support.

Just over two weeks later, U.S. President George W. Bush, Canadian Prime Minister Stephen Harper and former Mexican President Vicente Fox met in Cancún for the second annual summit of the Security and Prosperity Partnership. The leaders were each accompanied by five private sector representatives who pledged their commitment to the SPP process and helped set the agenda for the North American Competitiveness Council (NACC). They decided that the council would be composed of 30 CEOs, ten from each country, who would meet annually with senior government officials to advise them on corporate priorities for the SPP.

The NACC was officially launched on June 15, 2006, at a joint press conference held by Carlos Gutierrez, Mexican Economy Minister Sergio García de Alba and Canadian Industry Minister Maxime Bernier. According to a Council of the Americas report, the purpose of institutionalizing the North American business community's involvement in the SPP process was, "so that the work will continue through changes in administrations." The NACC will make sure that, "governments look to the private sector to tell them what needs to be done." According to a Canadian press release, the NACC "has a mandate to provide governments with recommendations on broad issues such as border facilitation and regulation, as well as the competitiveness of key sectors including automotive, transportation, manufacturing and services."

The NACC met again in Washington, D.C., on August 15, 2006. The meeting was chaired by Ron Covais, President of the Americas for Lockheed Martin, and was co-hosted by the U.S. Chamber of Commerce and the Council of the Americas – both U.S. NACC co-secretariats. The U.S. business leaders outlined their key priorities as "standards and regulatory cooperation, border security and infrastructure, supply chain management, energy integration, innovation, and external dimensions", but the NACC as a whole eventually agreed on three overall priorities: border crossing facilitation (to be handled by the Canadian NACC members), regulatory convergence (to be handled by the U.S. NACC) and energy integration, which the Mexican NACC members would handle.

The North American Competitiveness Council met with SPP ministers for the first time on February 23, 2007, in Ottawa. At that meeting, the business council released a preliminary report containing over 50 recommendations for continental integration, including a North American resource pact and intensified regulatory convergence between all three countries.

On July 26, 2007, the conservative, non-partisan U.S. government watchdog Judicial Watch notified Commerce Secretary Carlos Gutierrez that it was seeking access to the meetings and records of the North American Competitiveness Council (NACC) under the provisions of the Federal Advisory Committee Act (FACA) – the federal open meetings law (5 U.S.C App. 2 §3(2)).  "Specifically", said Judicial Watch in a press release, the group, "seeks to attend and/or participate in meetings of the NACC and its U.S. component subcommittees."

The NACC met again with SPP ministers and NAFTA leaders on August 21, 2007, at the Chateau Montebello hotel in Quebec, Canada. It was the only non-governmental organization with full access to the meeting, the third Security and Prosperity Partnership Leaders Summit since March 2005. The group of CEOs released another report praising the Canadian, Mexican and U.S. governments for moving quickly on NACC recommendations for a North American Regulatory Cooperation Framework and Intellectual Property Action Plan. The NACC report explained that the group is prepared, "to move beyond our initial report" and would be "pleased to engage on other strategic issues affecting the competitiveness and security of the North American economies."

The SPP has scheduled a meeting in New Orleans on April 21–22, 2008, where the three government leaders will meet with corporate leaders from each of the three nations to discuss "harmonization" of policies, in order to integrate environmental, energy, labor, and other standards for the benefit of these large corporations and for the purported benefit of mutual security.

Media coverage

Until the February 23, 2007 NACC/SPP meeting in Ottawa, there had been very little media coverage of the North American Competitiveness Council, its mandate or its meetings. In fact, the only mainstream North American source to write about the NACC has been Canada's Maclean's magazine, which ran a story on September 13 by Luiza Savage called "Meet NAFTA 2.0."

Savage described the NACC as a "cherry-picked group of executives who were whisked to Cancún in March by the leaders of Canada, the U.S. and Mexico, and asked to come up with a plan for taking North American integration beyond NAFTA." She quoted Annette Verschuren, president of Home Depot Canada, who called the Cancún meeting "an intimate discussion" and "a lot of fun [because] there were no reporters, just a freewheeling discussion on the things that drive you crazy."

Ron Covais of Lockheed Martin told Savage that, "The guidance from the ministers was, 'tell us what we need to do and we'll make it happen,'" and that rather than going through the legislative process in any country, the Security and Prosperity Partnership must be implemented in incremental changes by executive agencies, bureaucrats and regulators. "We've decided not to recommend any things that would require legislative changes", Covais tells Savage, "because we won't get anywhere."

NACC Members
U.S. Representatives:

 Campbell Soup Company
 Chevron Corporation
 Ford Motor Company
 FedEx Corporation
 General Electric Company
 General Motors Corp.
 Kansas City Southern
 Lockheed Martin Corporation
 Merck & Co., Inc.
 Mittal Steel USA
 New York Life Insurance Company
 The Procter & Gamble Company (joined in 2007)
 UPS
 Wal-Mart Stores, Inc.
 Whirlpool Corporation (note: Herman Cain was incorrectly noted as being a member of the NACC/SPP in representing the Whirlpool Corporation.  Herman Cain served on the board of directors for Whirlpool.  In order to be eligible to be an executive member of the NACC listed above, you must be a senior executive of the company being represented.  Jeff Fettig had been CEO of Whirlpool since 2004.)

Canadian Representatives:

 Dominic D'Alessandro, Manulife Financial
 Paul Desmarais, Jr., Power Corporation of Canada
 David A. Ganong, Ganong Bros. Limited
 Richard George, Suncor Energy Inc.
 E. Hunter Harrison, CN
 Linda Hasenfratz, Linamar Corporation (NACC chairperson)
 Michael Sabia, Bell Canada Enterprises
 Jim Shepherd, Canfor Corporation
 Annette Verschuren, The Home Depot
 Richard E. Waugh, Scotiabank

Mexican Representatives:

 José Luís Barraza, President of Consejo Coordinador Empresarial (CCE) and CEO of Grupo Impulso, Realiza & Asociados, Inmobiliaria Realiza and Optima
 Gastón Azcárraga, President of Consejo Mexicano de Hombres de Negocios (CMHN) and CEO of Mexicana de Aviación and Grupo Posadas
 León Halkin, President of Confederación de Cámaras Industriales (CONCAMIN) and chairman of the board and CEO of four companies in the industrial and real estate markets
 Valentín Díez, Chairman of the Mexican Business Council for Trade, Investment, and Technology (COMCE) and former Vicepresident of Grupo Modelo.
 Jaime Yesaki, President of Consejo Nacional Agropecuario (CNA) and CEO of several Poultry companies.
 Claudio X. González, President of Centro de Estudios Económicos del Sector Privado (CEESP) and chairman of the board and CEO Kimberly-Clark de Mexico
 Guillermo Vogel, Vice President of TAMSA (Tubos de Acero de México)
 César de Anda Molina, President and CEO of Avicar de Occidente
 Tomás González Sada, President and CEO of Grupo CYDSA
 Alfredo Moisés Ceja, President of Finca Montegrande

See also
 North American Free Trade Agreement
 Independent Task Force on North America

References

External links
 North American Competitiveness Council (NACC)
 Council of the Americas
 A North American Partnership
 US Mexico Business Council
 Alianza para la Seguridad y la Prosperidad en América del Norte
 Goode: no union on continent
 Dept. of Commerce, Homeland Security, etc. Documents
 Integrate This! Challenging the Security and Prosperity Partnership
 From NAFTA to the SPP from Dollars & Sense magazine, January/February 2008
 Council of Canadians
 Consortium for North American Higher Education Collaboration

Trilateral relations of Canada, Mexico, and the United States
International organizations based in the Americas
International trade organizations
Economy of North America
21st-century diplomatic conferences (Americas)